Bruno Loatti (26 February 1915 – 25 September 1962) was an Italian cyclist. He competed in the tandem event at the 1936 Summer Olympics.

References

External links
 

1915 births
1962 deaths
Italian male cyclists
Olympic cyclists of Italy
Cyclists at the 1936 Summer Olympics
Sportspeople from Ravenna
Cyclists from Emilia-Romagna